La Charte de 1830, subtitled journal du soir, was a French newspaper founded in Paris in 1836 by François Guizot. The publication supported the conservative party.

Established after the July revolution of 1830, this daily was published from 27 September 1836 to 11 July 1838. Nestor Roqueplan was the director as well as the main redactor with Armand Malitourne (chief editor).

In 1838 it was absorbed into Le Moniteur parisien.

Main collaborators 
 Gérard de Nerval, published seven dramatic feuilletons in La Charte.
 Théophile Gautier
 Louis Veuillot
 Charles Rabou

Bibliography 
 Paul Ginisty, Anthologie du journalisme du XVIIe siècle à nos jours, vol.I, La Révolution, le premier Empire, la Restauration, la seconde Restauration, le Gouvernement de juillet, la Révolution de 1848, 1917

Notes 

Defunct newspapers published in France
Newspapers published in Paris
Publications established in 1831
Publications disestablished in 1838
1831 establishments in France
1838 disestablishments in France
Daily newspapers published in France